The 2006–07 Xavier Musketeers men's basketball team represented Xavier University in the 2007–08 college basketball season. They were led by head coach Sean Miller in his third season at Xavier. The Musketeers were members of the Atlantic 10 Conference and played their home games at the Cintas Center. Xavier finished the season with a record of 25–9, 13–3 in A-10 play to share the regular season championship. They received an at-large bid to the NCAA tournament as the No. 9 seed in the South region. The Musketeers defeated BYU to advance to the second round before losing to No. 1 seed Ohio State.

Roster

Schedule and results 

|-
!colspan=9 style=| Exhibitions

|-
!colspan=9 style=| Non-conference regular season

|-
!colspan=9 style=| A-10 regular season

|-
!colspan=9 style=| A-10 tournament

|-
!colspan=9 style=|NCAA tournament

Rankings

References

Xavier
Xavier Musketeers men's basketball seasons
Xavier
Xavier Musketeers Men's Basketball Team
Xavier Musketeers Men's Basketball Team